Thomas Buxton may refer to:

Sir Fowell Buxton (Thomas Fowell Buxton, 1786–1845), MP and social reformer
Sir Fowell Buxton, 3rd Baronet (Thomas Fowell Buxton, 1837–1915), Governor of South Australia (1895–1899)
Sir Thomas Buxton, 4th Baronet (1865–1919), British aristocrat and philanthropist
Sir Thomas Buxton, 5th Baronet (1889–1945), of the Buxton baronets, High Sheriff of Essex
Sir Thomas Buxton, 6th Baronet (1925–1996), of the Buxton baronets
Thomas Buxton (New Zealand politician) (1863–1939), New Zealand MP 
Thomas C. Buxton (1875–1962), American lawyer, physician, writer, inventor, and politician

See also
Buxton (surname)